João de Almeida Jurado (born 18 May 1906 in Cacilhas, Portugal - date of death unknown) was a Portuguese footballer who played for Sporting and the Portugal national team, as central defender.

International career 
Jurado gained 4 caps and made his national team debut 2 April 1933, against Spain in Vigo, in a 0-3 defeat

External links 
 
 
 

1906 births
Sporting CP footballers
Portugal international footballers
Portuguese footballers
Year of death missing
Association football central defenders